Wang Bo is the name of:

Bora Vang (born 1987), Chinese-born Turkish table tennis player, born Wang Bo
Wang Bo (chancellor) (759–830), Tang dynasty chief minister
Wang Bo (footballer, born 1970), Chinese footballer
Wang Bo (footballer, born 1982), Chinese footballer
Wang Bo (footballer, born 1985), Chinese footballer
Wang Bo (martial artist) (born 1989), Chinese-American martial artist
Wang Bo (poet) (649–676), Tang dynasty poet

See also
Wang Pu (disambiguation)